The 21st Street Co-op is a student housing cooperative in Austin, Texas housing 100 residents. It is part of the College Houses co-op system.

Located at 707 West 21st Street, the house is just a few blocks west of the University of Texas at Austin campus and Guadalupe Street (the Drag). The 21st Street Co-op offers a combination of suites, walkways, balconies and landscapes.

History 
The five new buildings of College Houses were still under construction in August 1974 prior to the fall semester. William Tamminga, a popular Austin architect of the 1970s, designed and built the complex. The funding was provided by a loan from the United States Department of Housing and Urban Development (HUD). Michael McHone, now a local real estate developer, was primarily responsible for securing the funding.

One hundred contracts for new members were signed and dropped off at the College Houses, Inc. offices located in the Ark Co-op. The Ark was 21st Street Co-op’s “big sister”, located 50-yards away. Room and board contracts were originally $245 per month for a single room and $135 for a shared room. 

With the fall semester of 1974 about to begin, all of the inaugural members began showing up, but the buildings were still far from being ready. Contracts had been signed, so College Houses, Inc. rented some rooms at the former Brownstone Apartments as temporary housing. The Brownstone was half a mile away, six blocks north on Rio Grande.

Cold breakfast was available at the Brownstone. For almost two months everyone had to travel to the Ark for main meals. There were as many as 225 co-op residents coming to the Ark for dinner. Menus typically consisted of a vegetable, a salad, potatoes or pasta, a meat dish or meat substitute, and a dessert. Textured vegetable protein (TVP) was introduced as a cost-cutting measure.

In early November 1974 the buildings were officially opened. This day was celebrated at 21st Street Co-op for many years.

The buildings were mostly dark red cedar with bright blue trim and many windows. There wasn't any landscaping. The walkways and stairs were very slippery and caused several accidents. They were later treated to increase traction.

Closets had not been designed into the rooms due to budget constraints, so College Houses, Inc. contracted Foursquare Furniture to build heavy particle board units to use as closets. It was left up to the co-op residents to assemble them, paint them and install them in each room.

There have been various injuries and a fatality at the co-op over the years. One of the third-floor decks collapsed in 1987, seriously injuring three residents.  During the 1980s, a resident working on the roof was stung by a bee. He went into a panic and fell off of the roof, and did not survive.

Solar collectors were installed on the rooftops. As with the Ark and later Taos, a soda machine was modified to sell beer. This was strictly illegal and never approved by the TABC. In fact, there was much panic in the mid-1980s when a TABC agent's son became a member of the co-op. At 25¢ a bottle, it became necessary to make it an official house job to keep the money-making machine full. No such machine exists at the co-op presently.

Community structure

Labor
The co-op runs on a labor system. Each resident of the co-op does four hours of labor per week coordinated by the Labor Czar. Cooking, cleaning, and general house maintenance are a few examples of labor. Labor keeps the cost of living down as members fix and maintain the house themselves. Residents with a desire to invest themselves more into the co-op may run for officer positions.

When the 21st Street Co-Op opened there were initially three jobs available to residents. The Menu Planner reviewed the menus that each cook submitted and determined what food supplies were needed. The Kitchen Manager ordered the food and kitchen supplies and oversaw kitchen operations. The Accountant collected rent and maintained the treasury. Residents who filled these positions received a substantial reduction in their rent but were still responsible for weekly labor assignments.

House structure

Suites
The 100 members share furnished private and double rooms joined into small suites. Lofts are common in rooms. Each suite includes a common living room, kitchenette, semi-private baths and floor-to-ceiling windows opening out onto the front and back yards.

Other areas
The "TV Temple" provides three-tiered seating for residents to watch television or movies. A computer lab affords residents internet access and printing capabilities.

References

Sources
Many Hands: A History of the Austin Cooperative Community Library book link

External links
21st Street Co-Op Facebook Page
21st Street Co-op Overview YouTube video
Decisions are made by those who show up: Life and art at 21st Street Co-op A photo essay about 21st Street co-op by a former member

Buildings and structures in Austin, Texas
Student housing cooperatives in the United States
Residential buildings in Texas
1974 establishments in Texas
Residential buildings completed in 1974